Mahmoud Hassan (December 15, 1918 – November 10, 1998) was an Egyptian Greco-Roman Bantamweight wrestler. He competed for Egypt in the 1948 Summer Olympics in London, earning a silver medal behind Kurt Pettersén of Sweden and Halil Kaya of Turkey. He also competed at the 1952 Summer Olympics.

See also
 List of Egyptians

References

External links
Mahmoud Hassan's profile at Sports Reference.com
Mahmoud Hassan's profile at the Egyptian Ministry of Youth and Sport 

1918 births
1998 deaths
Olympic wrestlers of Egypt
Wrestlers at the 1948 Summer Olympics
Wrestlers at the 1952 Summer Olympics
Egyptian male sport wrestlers
Olympic silver medalists for Egypt
Olympic medalists in wrestling
Medalists at the 1948 Summer Olympics
20th-century Egyptian people